In the 1982–83 season, USM Alger is competing in the National for the 12th time, as well as the Algerian Cup.  It is their 2nd consecutive season in the top flight of Algerian football. They will be competing in National 1 and the Algerian Cup.

Squad list
Players and squad numbers last updated on 1 September 1982.Note: Flags indicate national team as has been defined under FIFA eligibility rules. Players may hold more than one non-FIFA nationality.

Competitions

Overview

Championnat National

League table

Results by round

Matches

Algerian Cup

African Cup Winners' Cup

Quarterfinals

Squad information

Appearances and goals
Only 24 games from 30 in National appearances
Round 2, 7, 12, 20, 26, 29.

|-

Goalscorers
Includes all competitive matches. The list is sorted alphabetically by surname when total goals are equal.

Transfers

References

External links
 Algeria 1982/83 season at rsssf.com 
 1982–83 USM Alger season at footballvintage.net 

USM Alger seasons
Algerian football clubs 1982–83 season